HD 150706 is a 7th magnitude star in the constellation of Ursa Minor. It is a remarkably Sun-like yellow dwarf (spectral type G0V) being only 6% less massive than the Sun.

Distance to the star, 92 light years, is enough that it is not visible to the unaided eye. However, it is an easy target for binoculars. It is located only about 10° from the northern celestial pole so it is always visible on the northern hemisphere except for near the equator. Likewise, it is never visible in most of the southern hemisphere.

The existence of an extrasolar planet orbiting this star was announced at the Scientific Frontiers in Research on Extrasolar Planets conference in 2002 . The claimed planet had a minimum mass equal to the mass of Jupiter and was thought to be located in an elliptical orbit with a period of 264 days. However independent measurements of the star failed to confirm the existence of the planet, and the planet does not appear in the current web version of the Catalog of Nearby Exoplanets. 
But another planet was discovered in system in 2012; this Jupiter-twin completes one orbit in roughly 16 years. Its eccentricity and orbit is very poorly constrained.

See also 
 HD 149143
 List of extrasolar planets

References

External links 

G-type main-sequence stars
150706
080902
Ursa Minor (constellation)
Planetary systems with one confirmed planet
Durchmusterung objects
Gliese and GJ objects